The Chatalar Inscription is a medieval Greek inscribed text upon a column in the village of Chatalar (modern Han Krum, North East Bulgaria) by the Bulgarian ruler Omurtag (815-831). It was unearthed in 1899 by the archaeologists Fyodor Uspensky, M. Popruzhenko, Vasil Zlatarski and Karel Škorpil.

Text and translation

See also
Palace of Omurtag
Bulgar calendar
Omurtag's Tarnovo Inscription

References
Southeastern Europe in the Middle Ages, 500-1250 By Florin Curta Page 161 
For a review of the excavations at Pliska see BESHEVLIEV, V. Iz kusno-antichnata i srednovekovnata geografiya na Severoiztochna Bulgariya. – IAI XXV, 1962, p. 1-18.
SKORPIL H. and K. Mogili, Plovdiv 1898, p. 153.
ZLATARSKI V.N. Gde nuzhno iskat' pervuyu bolgarskuyu stolicu – Trudy XI Arheologicheskogo suezda v Kieve 1899 g. T. II. Protokoly. M., 1902, p. 116-118.
Izvestiya Russkogo arheologicheskogo instituta v Konstantinopole. T. X, 1905.

Bulgarian Greek inscriptions